Vala Rud (also Romanized as Vālā Rūd; also known as Bārī (Persian: باري ), Baro, and Bārow) is a village in Zanjanrud-e Bala Rural District, in the Central District of Zanjan County, Zanjan Province, Iran. At the 2006 census, its population was 482, in 127 families.

References 

Populated places in Zanjan County